Marian Alexandru Neagu (born 29 October 1991), simply known as Marian Neagu is a Romanian professional footballer who plays as a midfielder.

Career
On 27 June 2014, he signed for Cypriot club Othellos Athienou for a one year loan deal.

Honours
CSA Steaua București
Liga III: 2020–21

References

External links
 

1991 births
Living people
Association football midfielders
Romanian footballers
Romanian expatriate footballers
CS Concordia Chiajna players
Othellos Athienou F.C. players
LPS HD Clinceni players
CS Balotești players
CSA Steaua București footballers
Liga I players
Liga II players
Cypriot First Division players
Cypriot Second Division players
Expatriate footballers in Cyprus
Karmiotissa FC players